The  St. Louis Cardinals season was the 52nd season the team was in the National Football League and twelfth in St. Louis. Led by first-year head coach Bob Hollway, the Cardinals failed to improve on their previous year's 8–5–1 record, winning only four games. They failed to reach the playoffs for the 23rd straight season, their previous appearance was in 1948 in the championship game.

This was the last season the team was co-owned by Charles Bidwill, Jr.; he sold his share to his younger brother Bill in September 1972. The adopted sons of Charles and Violet Bidwill, the two had co-owned the team since their mother's death in January 1962.

Hired in February, Hollway was previously the defensive coordinator of the Minnesota Vikings under head coach Bud Grant.

Roster

Schedule

Standings

References 

1971
St. Louis Cardinals